The 2015 Columbus Crew SC season was the club's twentieth season of existence, and their twentieth consecutive season in Major League Soccer, the top flight of American soccer.

Background

Review 
In coach Berhalter's second season, he led the club to an MLS Cup appearance that resulted in a loss to the Portland Timbers.  This season also saw returning striker Kei Kamara contend for the league's golden boot.

Roster 

Major League Soccer teams are limited to eight players without US citizenship, a permanent resident (green card holder), or other special status (e.g., refugee or asylum status). These international roster slots can be traded.

Competitions

Preseason

Friendlies

U.S. Open Cup

MLS

Standings

Eastern Conference

Overall table

Results summary

Results by round

Match results

MLS Cup Playoffs

Conference Semifinals

Conference Finals

MLS Cup Final

Statistics

Appearances 

 Numbers outside parentheses denote appearances as starter.
 Numbers in parentheses denote appearances as substitute.
 Players with no appearances are not included in the list.

Goals and assists

Disciplinary record

Additional suspensions

Transfers

In

Out

Recognition

MLS Player of the Week

MLS Save of the Week

MLS Team of the Week

Kits

See also 

 Columbus Crew SC
 2015 in American soccer
 2015 Major League Soccer season

References 

Columbus Crew seasons
Columbus Crew SC
Columbus Crew SC
Columbus Crew